Maude Valérie White (1855 – 1937) was a French-born English composer who became one of the most successful songwriters (in the English serious style) of the Victorian period.

Early years
Although born near Dieppe in Normandy to upper middle class parents, White and her family moved to England when she was only one year old. She spent her childhood in Heidelberg, Paris, and England, and played the piano from an early age. At seventeen she had already composed her first song. She studied Composition with Oliver May while in London, and Counterpoint and Harmony with W. S. Rockstro while living in Torquay. In 1876 White went to the Royal Academy of Music after she finally persuaded her reluctant mother to allow her to pursue music as a career. While at the Academy she studied Composition with George Alexander Macfarren, and set poems written in English, German, and French.

White was the first woman to be awarded the prestigious Mendelssohn Scholarship, which she received in 1879. Her father died while she was a child, but when White’s mother died in 1881, White was devastated, and went to Chile to be with her sister and to recuperate and recover her health. Upon returning to London in 1882, she thrust herself into a career as a professional musician and composer.  She made her way by teaching piano, and by writing songs and playing them at galas and soirées, sometimes presenting recitals with contralto, composer, and festival organizer Mary Augusta Wakefield. Later, using her linguistic skills, she earned a living by translating books and plays.

Composition
In 1883 White went to Vienna for six months to study with Robert Fuchs. He tried, unsuccessfully, to persuade her to extend her composition into more instrumental genres, a task which she never aggressively pursued. As Fuller notes, White’s music during this period of her career is characterized “by careful word setting, expansive melodies, a sense of rhythmic propulsion and an avoidance of clear-cut cadences" (Grove). As Grove indicates, this can be heard in her 1888 setting of Byron's ‘So we'll go no more a-roving’, one of her most enduring songs, which is dedicated to Herbert Beerbohm Tree.

Her setting of Shelley’s ‘My soul is an enchanted boat,’ published in 1882 has been described as ‘one of the best of our language’ (Fuller, 331). Later in the 1890s her musical style developed and shifted to incorporate elements of music from her global travels. Increasingly she also sought to realise in her songs the style of German Lieder.  Her ballet ‘The Enchanted Heart’ shows the influence of Russian ballet. Even later, past the turn of the century, her works become more impressionistic, as shown in ‘La Flûte Invisible’ (Victor Hugo) and ‘Le Foyer’ (Paul Verlaine). Her music creates a dreamy setting “through improvisatory motifs or repeated figures of open fourths or fifths” (Fuller, Grove).

Among other successful titles were Come to me in my dreams, Ye cupids droop each little head, Until (semper fidelis), Mary Morison and My soul is an enchanted boat.

Later years
In her last years, White wrote two memoirs, Friends and Memories, published 1914, and My Indian Summer, published 1932. She continued to organize concerts performing her compositions, and with the help of many patrons, students, performers, and protégés her music has been immortalized in the British canon.  She died, aged 82, in 1937.

She was interred in the churchyard of St. Edward's Roman Catholic Church, Sutton Green, Surrey.

Discography
In Praise of Woman, Hyperion 2004
Women at an Exposition: Music Composed by Women and Performed at the 1893 World's Fair in Chicago, Koch International Classics, 1993
 Two of M.V. White's best-known songs, "So we'll go no more a-roving" and "Absent yet present", were recorded by leading tenor Gervase Cary Elwes before World War I. Elwes and his wife were personal friends of the composer, who used to accompany him in concert: as he sang, 'in her excitement she would begin galloping away towards the climax until sometimes it became quite a question which of them would arrive first.'
White's song "To Mary" was recorded at least three times by the tenor Ben Davies, the first in 1903 and last in 1932.
The short piano suite "From the Ionian Sea" was recorded by pianist Christopher Howell in 2012 and published as part of a compilation of English piano music inspired by Italy entitled An Englishman in Italy: British Piano Music inspired by Italy, Sheva Collection, 2012

Bibliography
Gates, Eugene. Emerging from the Shadows: Maude Valerie White, a Significant Figure in the History of English Song. Kapralova Society Journal, vol. 18, no. 1 (2020): 1–6.

References
Notes

Sources
W. & R. Elwes, Gervase Elwes - The Story of His Life (Grayson and Grayson, London 1935).
S. Fuller, 'Maude Valerie White', in The Pandora guide to women composers : Britain and the United States 1629- present (Pandora, London & San Francisco 1994).
S. Fuller, 'Maude Valerie White', Grove Music Online April 10, 2007. http://www.grovemusic.com
D. Hyde, New-Found Voices: Women in Nineteenth-Century English Music 3rd Edn. (Ashgate, Aldershot 1998).

External links
 
 
 

1855 births
1937 deaths
19th-century classical composers
19th-century British composers
19th-century English musicians
19th-century women composers
20th-century classical composers
20th-century English composers
20th-century women composers
20th-century English women musicians
British women classical composers
English classical composers